Badr ibn Hasanwayh was the second ruler of the Hasanwayhids from 979 to 1014. He was the son and successor of Hasanwayh.

Biography 
During the civil war between the two Buyid brothers Adud al-Dawla and Izz al-Dawla, Hasanwayh had supported the latter. Following the death of Hasanwayh in 979, Adud al-Dawla invaded his territories, executed some of his sons, and installed Badr on the Hasanwayhid throne as his deputy over the neighbouring Kurdish territories. Following the death of Adud al-Dawla in 983, Badr showed his gratitude to him by having twenty men sent to on an annual pilgrimage to Mecca in the name of Adud al-Dawla (as well as Badr's parents). Like Adud al-Dawla, historians portray Badr as the ideal ruler, especially in protecting the settled farmers from his own nomad supporters.

Unlike his father, Badr attended many Buyid court meetings. Following the death of the Buyid ruler Fakhr al-Dawla, Badr went to Ray to help Majd al-Dawla administer the local affairs, but his help was rebuffed. As a result, Badr kept gradually dissociating himself from the affairs at Ray.

Badr was killed in 1014 by his commanders during the siege of a Kurdish fortress, due to ignoring their counsel to avoid fighting in the winter. Following Badr's death, most of his domain was conquered by the Annazids, while the Buyid ruler Shams al-Dawla took the rest. Badr's grandson Zahir ibn Hilal ibn Badr attempted to restore his grandfather's position with the support of the Buyids of Hamadan.

References

Sources 
 
 
 
 
 
 
 

10th-century rulers in Asia
11th-century rulers in Asia
Kurdish rulers
1014 deaths
Year of birth unknown
10th-century Kurdish people
11th-century Kurdish people
Shia monarchs